Charles Percy Erceg (28 November 1928 – 26 May 2019) was a New Zealand rugby union player. He played nine matches for the All Blacks including four internationals.

Affiliating to Ngāti Kurī, Erceg represented New Zealand Māori from 1950 to 1952, and in 1951 he was awarded the Tom French Cup as the Māori player of the year. He later served as a national Māori selector from 1972 to 1983, was the manager of the New Zealand Māori side that toured Australia and the Pacific Islands in 1979 and coach of the 1982 team that toured Wales.

Erceg died in Kaitaia on 26 May 2019.

References

1928 births
2019 deaths
Ngāti Kurī people
People from the Northland Region
People educated at Sacred Heart College, Auckland
New Zealand rugby union players
New Zealand international rugby union players
Northland rugby union players
Auckland rugby union players
Māori All Blacks players
Rugby union wings
New Zealand rugby union coaches
New Zealand sports executives and administrators
New Zealand people of Croatian descent